Matsuyama may refer to:

Places
Matsuyama, Ehime, the capital city of Ehime Prefecture, Japan
Matsuyama, Kagoshima, a former town in Soo District in Kagoshima Prefecture, Japan
Matsuyama, Miyagi, a town in Shida District in Miyagi Prefecture, Japan
Matsuyama Town, which changed its name to Higashimatsuyama, Saitama on 1 July 1954
Matsuyama, Yamagata, a town in Akumi District in Yamagata Prefecture, Japan
Matsuyama, Taihoku or Songshan District, a district in Taipei, Taiwan

Other uses
Matsuyama (surname)

See also
松山 (disambiguation)